Synaptotylus is an extinct genus of prehistoric sarcopterygians or lobe-finned fish from the Pennsylvanian.  The type species is Synaptotylus newelli (Hibbard 1933).

See also

 Sarcopterygii
 List of sarcopterygians
 List of prehistoric bony fish

References

Prehistoric lobe-finned fish genera
Fossil taxa described in 1963